Diospyros fusiformis is a tree in the family Ebenaceae. Inflorescences bear up to 10 flowers. The specific epithet  is from the Latin meaning "spindle-shaped", referring to the fruits. Habitat is mixed dipterocarp forests from sea level to  altitude. D. fusiformis is endemic to Borneo.

References

fusiformis
Endemic flora of Borneo
Trees of Borneo
Plants described in 1977